Zagreb is the capital and largest city of Croatia. It is in the northwest of the country, along the Sava river, at the southern slopes of the Medvednica mountain. The population of the Zagreb urban agglomeration is 1,071,150, approximately a quarter of the total population of Croatia, while at the 2021 census the city itself had a population of 767,131.

Zagreb is a city with a rich history dating from Roman times. The oldest settlement in the vicinity of the city was the Roman Andautonia, in today's Ščitarjevo. The historical record of the name "Zagreb" dates from 1134, in reference to the foundation of the settlement at Kaptol in 1094. Zagreb became a free royal city in 1242. In 1851 Janko Kamauf became Zagreb's first mayor.

Zagreb has special status as a Croatian administrative division - it comprises a consolidated city-county (but separate from Zagreb County), and is administratively subdivided into 17 city districts. Most of the city districts lie at a low elevation along the valley of the river Sava, but northern and northeastern city districts, such as Podsljeme and Sesvete districts are situated in the foothills of the Medvednica mountain, making the city's geographical image quite diverse.
 
Zagreb ranks as a global city, with a Beta − rating from the Globalization and World Cities Research Network.

The transport connections, the concentration of industry, scientific, and research institutions and industrial tradition underlie its leading economic position in Croatia. Zagreb is the seat of the central government, administrative bodies, and almost all government ministries. Almost all of the largest Croatian companies, media, and scientific institutions have their headquarters in the city. Zagreb is the most important transport hub in Croatia: here Central Europe, the Mediterranean and Southeast Europe meet, making the Zagreb area the centre of the road, rail and air networks of Croatia. It is a city known for its diverse economy, high quality of living, museums, sporting, and entertainment events. Major branches of Zagreb's economy include high-tech industries and the service sector.

Name

The etymology of the name Zagreb is unclear. It was used for the united city only from 1852, but it had been in use as the name of the Zagreb Diocese since the 12th century and was increasingly used for the city in the 17th century.
The name is first recorded in a charter by archbishop of Esztergom Felician, dated 1134, mentioned as Zagrabiensem episcopatum.

The older form of the name is Zagrab. The modern Croatian form Zagreb is first recorded in a 1689 map by Nicolas Sanson.
An even older form is reflected in Hungarian Zabrag (recorded from c. 1200 and in use until the 18th century).
For this, Hungarian linguist Gyula Décsy proposes the etymology of Chabrag, a well-attested hypocorism of the name Cyprian. The same form is reflected in a number of Hungarian toponyms, such as Csepreg.

The name might be derived from Proto-Slavic word *grębъ which means hill, uplift. (However, note Serbo-Croatian brȇg < Proto-Slavic *bergъ, which also means '(smaller) hill', and za brȇg 'to or toward the hill' for the seemingly metathesized variant in Hungarian, Zabrag – possibly modified from assumed *Zabreg because of Hungarian vowel harmony.) An Old Croatian reconstructed name *Zagrębъ is manifested through the German name of the city Agram.

The name Agram was used in German in the Habsburg period; this name has been classified as "probably of Roman origin"
but according to Décsy (1990) it could be an Austrian German reanalysis of *Zugram.

In Middle Latin and Modern Latin, Zagreb is known as  Agranum (the name of an unrelated Arabian city in Strabo), Zagrabia or Mons Graecensis (also Mons Crecensis, in reference to Grič (Gradec)).

In Croatian folk etymology, the name of the city has been derived from either the verb  za-grab-, meaning  "to scoop" or "to dig". One folk legend illustrating this derivation 
ties the name to a drought of the early 14th century, during which Augustin Kažotić (c. 1260–1323) is said to have dug a well which miraculously produced water.
In another legend, a city governor is thirsty and orders a girl named Manda to "scoop" water from the Manduševac well (nowadays a fountain in Ban Jelačić Square), using the imperative: Zagrabi, Mando! ("Scoop, Manda!").

History

The oldest settlement located near today's Zagreb was the Roman town of Andautonia, now Ščitarjevo, which existed between the 1st and the 5th century AD.
The first recorded appearance of the name Zagreb is dated to 1094, at which time the city existed as two different city centers: the smaller, eastern Kaptol, inhabited mainly by clergy and housing Zagreb Cathedral, and the larger, western Gradec, inhabited mainly by craftsmen and merchants. Gradec and Kaptol were united in 1851 by ban Josip Jelačić, who was credited for this by naming the main city square, Ban Jelačić Square in his honor.

During the period of former Yugoslavia, Zagreb remained an important economic centre of the country, and was the second largest city. After Croatia declared independence from Yugoslavia, Zagreb was proclaimed its capital.

Early Zagreb
The history of Zagreb dates as far back as 1094 A.D. when the Hungarian King Ladislaus, returning from his campaign against Croatia, founded a diocese. Alongside the bishop's see, the canonical settlement Kaptol developed north of Zagreb Cathedral, as did the fortified settlement Gradec on the neighbouring hill; the border between the two being the Medveščak stream. Today the latter is Zagreb's Upper Town (Gornji Grad) and is one of the best preserved urban nuclei in Croatia. Both settlements came under Tatar attack in 1242. As a sign of gratitude for offering him a safe haven from the Tatars the Croatian and Hungarian King Béla IV bestowed Gradec with a Golden Bull, which offered its citizens exemption from county rule and autonomy, as well as its own judicial system.

16th to 18th centuries
There were numerous connections between the Kaptol diocese and the free sovereign town of Gradec for both economic and political reasons, but they weren't known as an integrated city, even as Zagreb became the political center and, representing both Croatia, Slavonia and Dalmatia, first convened at Gradec. Zagreb became Croatian capital in 1557, with city also being chosen as the seat of the Ban of Croatia in 1621 under ban Nikola IX Frankopan.

At the invitation of the Croatian Parliament, the Jesuits came to Zagreb and built the first grammar school, the St. Catherine's Church and monastery. In 1669, they founded an academy where philosophy, theology, and law were taught, the forerunner of today's University of Zagreb.

During the 17th and 18th centuries, Zagreb was badly devastated by fire and the plague. In 1776, the royal council (government) moved from Varaždin to Zagreb and during the reign of Joseph II Zagreb became the headquarters of the Varaždin and Karlovac general command.

19th to mid-20th century

In the 19th century, Zagreb was the center of the Croatian National Revival and saw the erection of important cultural and historic institutions.
In 1850, the town was united under its first mayor – Janko Kamauf.

The first railway line to connect Zagreb with Zidani Most and Sisak was opened in 1862 and in 1863 Zagreb received a gasworks. The Zagreb waterworks was opened in 1878.

After the 1880 Zagreb earthquake, up to the 1914 outbreak of World War I, development flourished and the town received the characteristic layout which it has today.
The first horse-drawn tram was used in 1891. The construction of the railway lines enabled the old suburbs to merge gradually into Donji Grad, characterized by a regular block pattern that prevails in Central European cities. This bustling core hosts many imposing buildings, monuments, and parks as well as a multitude of museums, theatres, and cinemas. An electric power plant was built in 1907.

Since 1 January 1877, the Grič cannon is fired daily from the Lotrščak Tower on Grič to mark midday. The first half of the 20th century saw a considerable expansion of Zagreb. Before World War I, the city expanded and neighborhoods like Stara Peščenica in the east and Črnomerec in the west were created. After the war, working-class districts such as Trnje emerged between the railway and the Sava, whereas the construction of residential districts on the hills of the southern slopes of Medvednica was completed between the two World Wars.

In the 1920s, the population of Zagreb increased by 70 percent – the largest demographic boom in the history of the town. In 1926, the first radio station in the region began broadcasting from Zagreb, and in 1947 the Zagreb Fair was opened.

During World War II, Zagreb became the capital of the Independent State of Croatia, which was backed by Nazi Germany and the Italians. The history of Zagreb in World War II became rife with incidents of regime terror and resistance sabotage, and the Ustaša regime had thousands of people executed during the war in and near the city. The city was taken by the Partisans at the end of the war. From 1945 until 1990, Zagreb was the capital of the Socialist Republic of Croatia, one of the six constituent socialist republics of the Socialist Federal Republic of Yugoslavia.

Contemporary era
The area between the railway and the Sava river witnessed a new construction boom after World War II. After the mid-1950s, construction of new residential areas south of the Sava river began, resulting in Novi Zagreb (Croatian for New Zagreb), originally called "Južni Zagreb" (Southern Zagreb). 
Today Novi Zagreb is divided in two city districts: Novi Zagreb – zapad (New Zagreb – West) and Novi Zagreb – istok (New Zagreb – East)

The city also expanded westward and eastward, incorporating Dubrava, Podsused, Jarun, Blato, and other settlements.

The cargo railway hub and the international airport Pleso were built south of the Sava river. The largest industrial zone (Žitnjak) in the south-eastern part of the city represents an extension of the industrial zones on the eastern outskirts of the city, between the Sava and the Prigorje region. Zagreb also hosted the Summer Universiade in 1987. This event initiated the creation of pedestrian-only zones in the city centre and numerous new sport infrastructure, lacking until then, all around the city. 

During the 1991–1995 Croatian War of Independence, it was a scene of some sporadic fighting surrounding its JNA army barracks, but escaped major damage. In May 1995, it was targeted by Serb rocket artillery in two rocket attacks which killed seven civilians and wounded many.

An urbanized area connects Zagreb with the surrounding towns of Zaprešić, Samobor, Dugo Selo, and Velika Gorica. Sesvete was the first and the closest area to become a part of the agglomeration and is already included in the City of Zagreb for administrative purposes and now forms the easternmost city district.

In 2020 the city was hit by a 5.5 magnitude earthquake. Various buildings in the historic downtown area were damaged. The city's iconic cathedral lost the cross off of one of its towers. This earthquake was the strongest one to affect the city since the destructive 1880 Zagreb earthquake.

Area and population development

Geography

Climate 

The climate of Zagreb is classified as an oceanic climate (Köppen climate classification Cfb) with significant continental influences, very closely bordering on a humid continental climate (Dfa/Dfb) as well as a humid subtropical climate (Cfa). Zagreb has four separate seasons. Summers are generally warm, sometimes hot. In late May it gets significantly warmer, temperatures start rising and it is often very warm or even hot with occasional afternoon and evening thunderstorms. Heatwaves can occur but are short-lived. Temperatures rise above  on average 14.6 days each summer. Rainfall is abundant in summertime, falling mainly during thunderstorms. With 840 mm of precipitation per year, Zagreb is Europe's ninth wettest capital, receiving less precipitation than Luxembourg but more than Brussels, Paris or London. Compared to these cities, however, Zagreb has less rainy days, but the annual rainfall is higher due to heavier showers occurring mainly in late spring and summer. Autumn in its early stage often brings pleasant and sunny weather with occasional episodes of rain later in the season. Late autumn is characterized by a mild increase in the number of rainy days and a gradual decline in temperature averages. Morning fog is common from mid-October to January, with northern city districts at the foothills of the Medvednica mountain as well as south-central districts along the Sava river being more prone to longer fog accumulation. Winters are relatively cold, bringing overcast skies and a precipitation decrease pattern. February is the driest month, averaging 39 mm of precipitation. On average there are 29 days with snowfall, with the first snow usually falling in early December. However, in recent years, the number of days with snowfall in wintertime has decreased considerably. Springs are generally mild and very pleasant with sporadic weather changes and are somewhat windier than other seasons. As the season progresses, sunny days become more frequent, bringing higher temperatures. Sometimes cold spells can occur, mostly in springtime's early stages.

Cityscape
The most important historical high-rise constructions are Neboder (1958) on Ban Jelačić Square, Cibona Tower (1987), and Zagrepčanka (1976) on Savska Street, Mamutica in Travno (Novi Zagreb – istok district, built in 1974) and Zagreb TV Tower on Sljeme (built in 1973).

In the 2000s, the City Assembly approved a new plan that allowed for the many recent high-rise buildings in Zagreb, such as the Almeria Tower, Eurotower, HOTO Tower, Zagrebtower and one of the tallest skyscrapers Sky Office Tower.

In Novi Zagreb, the neighbourhoods of Blato and Lanište expanded significantly, including the Zagreb Arena and the adjoining business centre.

Due to a long-standing restriction that forbade the construction of 10-story or higher buildings, most of Zagreb's high-rise buildings date from the 1970s and 1980s and new apartment buildings on the outskirts of the city are usually 4–8 floors tall. Exceptions to the restriction have been made in recent years, such as permitting the construction of high-rise buildings in Lanište or Kajzerica.

Surroundings

The wider Zagreb area has been continuously inhabited since the prehistoric period, as witnessed by archaeological findings in the Veternica cave from the Paleolithic and excavation of the remains of the Roman Andautonia near the present village of Šćitarjevo.

Picturesque former villages on the slopes of Medvednica, Šestine, Gračani, and Remete, maintain their rich traditions, including folk costumes, Šestine umbrellas, and gingerbread products.

To the north is the Medvednica Mountain, with its highest peak Sljeme(1,035 m), where one of the tallest structures in Croatia, Zagreb TV Tower is located. The Sava and the Kupa valleys are to the south of Zagreb, and the region of Hrvatsko Zagorje is located on the other (northern) side of the Medvednica hill. In mid-January 2005, Sljeme held its first World Ski Championship tournament.

From the summit, weather permitting, the vista reaches as far as Velebit Range along Croatia's rocky northern coast, as well as the snow-capped peaks of the towering Julian Alps in neighboring Slovenia. There are several lodging villages, offering accommodation and restaurants for hikers. Skiers visit Sljeme, which has four ski-runs, three ski-lifts, and a chairlift.

The old Medvedgrad, a recently restored medieval burg was built in the 13th century on Medvednica hill. It overlooks the western part of the city and also hosts the Shrine of the Homeland, a memorial with an eternal flame, where Croatia pays reverence to all its heroes fallen for homeland in its history, customarily on national holidays. The ruined medieval fortress Susedgrad is located on the far-western side of Medvednica hill. It has been abandoned since the early 17th century, but it is visited during the year.

Zagreb occasionally experiences earthquakes, due to the proximity of Žumberak-Medvednica fault zone. It's classified as an area of high seismic activity. The area around Medvednica was the epicentre of the 1880 Zagreb earthquake (magnitude 6.3), and the area is known for occasional landslide threatening houses in the area. The proximity of strong seismic sources presents a real danger of strong earthquakes. Croatian Chief of Office of Emergency Management Pavle Kalinić stated Zagreb experiences around 400 earthquakes a year, most of them being imperceptible. However, in case of a strong earthquake, it's expected that 3,000 people would die and up to 15,000 would be wounded.

Demographics

Zagreb is by far the largest city in Croatia in terms of area and population. The 2021 census counted 767,131 residents.

Zagreb metropolitan area population is slightly above 1.0 million inhabitants, as it includes the Zagreb County. Zagreb metropolitan area makes approximately a quarter of a total population of Croatia.
In 1997, the City of Zagreb itself was given special County status, separating it from Zagreb County, although it remains the administrative centre of both.

The majority of its citizens are Croats making up 93% of the city's population (2011 census). The same census records around 55,000 residents belonging to ethnic minorities: 17,526 Serbs (2.22%), 8,119 Bosniaks (1.03%), 4,292 Albanians (0.54%), 2,755 Romani (0.35%), 2,132 Slovenes (0.27%), 1,194 Macedonians (0.15%), 1,191 Montenegrins (0.15%), and a number of other smaller communities.

City districts 

Since 14 December 1999 City of Zagreb is divided into 17 city districts (gradska četvrt, pl. gradske četvrti):

City districts are subdivided in 218 local committees as primary units of local self-government.

Settlements 
The city itself is not the only standalone settlement in the City of Zagreb administrative area – there are a number of larger urban settlements like Sesvete and Lučko and a number of smaller villages attached to it whose population is tracked separately.

There are 70 settlements in the City of Zagreb administrative area:

Politics and government 

Zagreb is the capital of the Republic of Croatia, its political center and the center of various state institutions. On the St. Mark's Square are the seats of the Government of the Republic of Croatia in the Banski Dvori complex, the Croatian Parliament (Sabor), as well as the Constitutional Court of the Republic of Croatia. Various ministries and state agencies are located in the wider area of the City of Zagreb.

City governance 

The current mayor of Zagreb is Tomislav Tomašević ('We can!'), elected in the 2021 Zagreb local elections, the second round of which was held on 30 May 2021. There are two deputy mayors elected from the same list, Danijela Dolenec and Luka Korlaet.

The Zagreb Assembly is composed of 51 representatives, elected in the 2021 Zagreb local elections.

The Zagreb Assembly is composed of 51 representatives, elected in the 2021 Zagreb local elections.

According to the Constitution, the city of Zagreb, as the capital of Croatia, has a special status. As such, Zagreb performs self-governing public affairs of both city and county. It is also the seat of the Zagreb County which encircles Zagreb.

The city administration bodies are the Zagreb City Assembly (Gradska skupština Grada Zagreba) as the representative body and the mayor of Zagreb  (Gradonačelnik Grada Zagreba) who is the executive head of the city.

The City Assembly is the representative body of the citizens of the City of Zagreb elected for a four-year term on the basis of universal suffrage in direct elections by secret ballot using proportional system with d'Hondt method in a manner specified by law. There are 51 representatives in the City Assembly, among them the president and vice-presidents of the assembly are elected by the representatives.

Before 2009, the mayor was elected by the City Assembly. It was changed to direct elections by majoritarian vote (two-round system) in 2009. The mayor is the head of the city administration and has two deputies (directly elected together with him/her).

The term of office of the mayor (and his/her deputies) is four years. The mayor (with the deputies) may be recalled by a referendum according to the law (not less than 20% of all electors in the City of Zagreb or not less than two-thirds of the Zagreb Assembly city deputies have the right to initiate a city referendum regarding recalling of the mayor; when a majority of voters taking part in the referendum vote in favor of the recall, provided that majority includes not less than one-third of all persons entitled to vote in the City of Zagreb, i.e.  of persons in the City of Zagreb electoral register, the mayor's mandate shall be deemed revoked and special mayoral by-elections shall be held).

In the City of Zagreb, the mayor is also responsible for the state administration (due to the special status of Zagreb as a "city with county rights", there isn't a State Administration Office which in all counties performs tasks of the central government).

City administration offices, institutions and services (18 city offices, 1 public institute or bureau and 2 city services) have been founded for performing activities within the self-administrative sphere and activities entrusted by the state administration.
The city administrative bodies are managed by the principals (appointed by the mayor for a four-year term of office, may be appointed again to the same duty). The City Assembly Professional Service is managed by the secretary of the City Assembly (appointed by the Assembly).

Local government is organised in 17 city districts represented by City District Councils. Residents of districts elect members of councils.

International relations

Twin towns – sister cities
Zagreb is twinned with the following towns and cities:

  Bologna, Italy (since 1963)
  Mainz, Germany (since 1967)
  Saint Petersburg, Russia (since 1968)
  Tromsø, Norway (since 1971)
  Buenos Aires, Argentina (since 1972)
  Kyoto, Japan (since 1972)
 Lisbon, Portugal (since 1977)
 Pittsburgh, United States (since 1980)
 Shanghai, China (since 1980)
 Budapest, Hungary (since 1994)
 La Paz, Bolivia (since 2000)
 Sarajevo, Bosnia and Herzegovina (since 2001)
 Ljubljana, Slovenia (since 2001)
 Podgorica, Montenegro (since 2006)
 Tabriz, Iran  (since 2006)
 Ankara, Turkey (since 2008)
 London, United Kingdom (since 2009)
 Skopje, North Macedonia (since 2011)
 Warsaw, Poland (since 2011)
 Pristina, Kosovo (since 2012)
 Astana, Kazakhstan (since 2014)
 Rome, Italy (since 2014)
 Vienna, Austria (since 2014)
 Petrinja, Croatia (since 2015)
 Vukovar, Croatia (since 2016)
 Xiangyang, China (since 2017)

Partner cities

The city has partnership arrangements with:

Culture

Tourism

Zagreb is an important tourist center, not only in terms of passengers traveling from the rest of Europe to the Adriatic Sea but also as a travel destination itself. Since the end of the war, it has attracted close to a million visitors annually, mainly from Austria, Germany, and Italy, and in recent years many tourists from far east (South Korea, Japan, China, and last two years, from India). It has become an important tourist destination, not only in Croatia, but considering the whole region of southeastern Europe. There are many interesting sights and happenings for tourists to attend in Zagreb, for example, the two statues of Saint George, one at the Republic of Croatia Square, the other at the Stone Gate, where the image of Virgin Mary is said to be the only thing that hasn't burned in the 17th-century fire. Also, there is an art installation starting in the Bogovićeva Street, called Nine Views.

Zagreb is also famous for its award-winning Christmas market that had been named the one in Europe for three years in a row (2015, 2016, 2017) by European Best Destinations.

The capital is also known for its top Restaurants in Zagreb that offer more than traditional Croatian food and classic dishes.

The historical part of the city to the north of Ban Jelačić Square is composed of the Gornji Grad and Kaptol, a medieval urban complex of churches, palaces, museums, galleries and government buildings that are popular with tourists on sightseeing tours. The historic district can be reached on foot, starting from the Ban Jelačić Square, the center of Zagreb, or by a funicular on nearby Tomićeva Street. Each Saturday, (from April until the end of September), on St. Mark's Square in the Upper town, tourists can meet members of the Order of The Silver Dragon (Red Srebrnog Zmaja), who reenact famous historical conflicts between Gradec and Kaptol. It's a great opportunity for all visitors to take photographs of authentic and fully functional historical replicas of medieval armor.

In 2010 more than 600,000 tourists visited the city, with a 10% increase seen in 2011. In 2012 a total of 675 707 tourists visited the city. A record number of tourists visited Zagreb in 2017. – 1.286.087, up 16% compared to the year before, which generated 2.263.758 overnight stays, up 14,8%.

Souvenirs and gastronomy

Numerous shops, boutiques, store houses and shopping centers offer a variety of quality clothing. There are about fourteen big shopping centers in Zagreb. Zagreb's offerings include crystal, china and ceramics, wicker or straw baskets, and top-quality Croatian wines and gastronomic products.

Notable Zagreb souvenirs are the tie or cravat, an accessory named after Croats who wore characteristic scarves around their necks in the Thirty Years' War in the 17th century and the ball-point pen, a tool developed from the inventions by Slavoljub Eduard Penkala, an inventor and a citizen of Zagreb.

Many Zagreb restaurants offer various specialties of national and international cuisine. Domestic products which deserve to be tasted include turkey, duck or goose with mlinci (a kind of pasta), štrukli (cottage cheese strudel), sir i vrhnje (cottage cheese with cream), kremšnite (custard slices in flaky pastry), and orehnjača (traditional walnut roll).

Cultural institutions
Zagreb's museums reflect the history, art, and culture not only of Zagreb and Croatia, but also of Europe and the world. Around thirty collections in museums and galleries comprise more than 3.6 million various exhibits, excluding church and private collections.

The Archaeological Museum collections, today consisting of nearly 450,000 varied archaeological artefacts and monuments, have been gathered over the years from many different sources. These holdings include evidence of Croatian presence in the area. The most famous are the Egyptian collection, the Zagreb mummy and bandages with the oldest Etruscan inscription in the world (Liber Linteus Zagrabiensis), as well as the numismatic collection.

Modern Gallery holds the most important and comprehensive collection of paintings, sculptures and drawings by 19th- and 20th-century Croatian artists. The collection numbers more than 10,000 works of art, housed since 1934 in the historic Vranyczany Palace in the center of Zagreb, overlooking the Zrinjevac Park. A secondary gallery is the Josip Račić Studio.

Croatian Natural History Museum holds one of the world's most important collections of Neanderthal remains found at one site. These are the remains, stone weapons, and tools of prehistoric Krapina man. The holdings of the Croatian Natural History Museum comprise more than 250,000 specimens distributed among various collections.

Technical Museum was founded in 1954 and it maintains the oldest preserved machine in the area, dating from 1830, which is still operational. The museum exhibits numerous historic aircraft, cars, machinery and equipment.

Museum of the City of Zagreb was established in 1907 by the Association of the Braća Hrvatskog Zmaja. It is located in a restored monumental complex (Popov toranj, the Observatory, Zakmardi Granary) of the former Convent of the Poor Clares, of 1650. The Museum deals with topics from the cultural, artistic, economic and political history of the city spanning from Roman finds to the modern period. The holdings comprise over 80,000 items arranged systematically into collections of artistic and mundane objects characteristic of the city and its history.

Arts and Crafts Museum was founded in 1880 with the intention of preserving the works of art and craft against the new predominance of industrial products. With its 160,000 exhibits, the Arts and Crafts Museum is a national-level museum for artistic production and the history of material culture in Croatia.

Ethnographic Museum was founded in 1919. It lies in the fine Secession building of the one-time Trades Hall of 1903. The ample holdings of about 80,000 items cover the ethnographic heritage of Croatia, classified in three cultural zones: the Pannonian, Dinaric and Adriatic.

Mimara Museum was founded with a donation from Ante "Mimara" Topić and opened to the public in 1987. It is located in a late 19th-century neo-Renaissance palace.The holdings comprise 3,750 works of art of various techniques and materials, and different cultures and civilizations.

Croatian Museum of Naïve Art is one of the first museums of naïve art in the world. The museum holds works of Croatian naïve expression of the 20th century. It is located in the 18th-century Raffay Palace in the Gornji Grad. The museum holdings consist of almost 2000 works of art – paintings, sculptures, drawings, and prints, mainly by Croatians but also by other well-known world artists. From time to time, the museum organizes topics and retrospective exhibitions by naïve artists, expert meetings and educational workshops and playrooms.

The Museum of Contemporary Art was founded in 1954. Its new building hosts a rich collection of Croatian and international contemporary visual art which has been collected throughout the decades from the nineteen-fifties until today. The museum is located in the center of Novi Zagreb, opened in 2009. The old location is now part of the Kulmer Palace in the Gornji Grad.

The Institute for Contemporary Art (Institut za suvremenu umjetnost), successor to the Soros Center for Contemporary Art – Zagreb (SCCA – Zagreb), was founded in 1993, and registered as an independent nonprofit organization in 1998. It was founded and run by  art historians, curators, artists, photographers, designers, publishers, academics, and journalists, and initially located at the Museum of Contemporary Art. After moving a number of times, the institute has a gallery at the Academia Moderna. Its aims are to promote contemporary Croation artists and the visual and other creative arts; to start documenting contemporary artists; and to build a body of contemporary art. It established the Radoslav Putar Award in 2002.

The Strossmayer Gallery of Old Masters offers permanent holdings presenting European paintings from the 14th to 19th centuries, and the Ivan Meštrović Studio, with sculptures, drawings, lithography portfolios and other items, was a donation of this great artist to his homeland The Museum and Gallery Center introduces on various occasions the Croatian and foreign cultural and artistic heritage. The Art Pavilion by Viennese architects Hellmer and Fellmer who were the most famous designers of theatres in Central Europe is a neo-classical exhibition complex and one of the landmarks of the downtown. The exhibitions are also held in the impressive Meštrović building on the Square of the Victims of Fascism – the Home of Croatian Fine Artists. The World Center "Wonder of Croatian Naïve Art" exhibits masterpieces of Croatian naïve art as well as the works of a new generation of artists. The Modern Gallery comprises all relevant fine artists of the 19th and 20th centuries. The Museum of Broken Relationships at 2 Ćirilometodska holds people's mementos of past relationships. It is the first private museum in the country. Lauba House (23a Baruna Filipovića) presents works from Filip Trade Collection, a large private collection of modern and contemporary Croatian art and current artistic production.

Other museums and galleries are also found in the Croatian School Museum, the Croatian Hunting Museum, the Croatian Sports Museum, the Croatian Post and Telecommunications Museum, the HAZU (Croatian Academy of Sciences and Arts) Glyptotheque (collection of monuments), and the HAZU Graphics Cabinet.

Events
Zagreb has been, and is, hosting some of the most popular mainstream artists, in the past few years their concerts held the Rolling Stones, U2, Eric Clapton, Deep Purple, Bob Dylan, David Bowie, Roger Waters, Depeche Mode, Prodigy, Beyoncé, Nick Cave, Jamiroquai, Manu Chao, Massive Attack, Metallica, Snoop Dogg, Lady Gaga, Duran Duran as well as some of world most recognised underground artists such as Dimmu Borgir, Sepultura, Melvins, Mastodon and many more.

Zagreb is also the home of the INmusic festival, one of the biggest open-air festivals in Croatia which is held every year, usually at the end of June. There is also the Zagreb Jazz Festival which has featured popular jazz artists like Pat Metheny or Sonny Rollins. Many others festivals occur in Zagreb like Žedno uho featuring indie, rock, metal and electronica artists such as Animal Collective, Melvins, Butthole Surfers, Crippled Black Phoenix, NoMeansNo, The National, Mark Lanegan, Swans, Mudhoney around the clubs and concert halls of Zagreb.

Performing arts
There are about 20 permanent or seasonal theatres and stages. The Croatian National Theater in Zagreb was built in 1895 and opened by emperor Franz Joseph I of Austria. The most renowned concert hall named "Vatroslav Lisinski", after the composer of the first Croatian opera, was built in 1973.

The World Theatre Festival and International Puppet Festival both take place in Zagreb in September and October.

Animafest, the World Festival of Animated Films, takes place every even-numbered year, and the Music Biennale, the international festival of avant-garde music, every odd-numbered year. It also hosts the annual ZagrebDox documentary film festival. The Festival of the Zagreb Philharmonic and the flowers exhibition Floraart (end of May or beginning of June), the Old-timer Rally annual events. In the summer, theatre performances and concerts, mostly in the Upper Town, are organized either indoors or outdoors. The stage on Opatovina hosts the Zagreb Histrionic Summer theatre events.

Zagreb is also the host of Zagrebfest, the oldest Croatian pop-music festival, as well as of several traditional international sports events and tournaments. The Day of the City of Zagreb on 16 November is celebrated every year with special festivities, especially on the Jarun lake in the southwestern part of the city.

Recreation and sports

 
Zagreb is home to numerous sports and recreational centers. Recreational Sports Center Jarun, situated on Jarun Lake in the southwest of the city, has fine shingle beaches, a world-class regatta course, a jogging lane around the lake, several restaurants, many night clubs and a discothèque. Its sports and recreation opportunities include swimming, sunbathing, waterskiing, angling, and other water sports, but also beach volleyball, football, basketball, handball, table tennis, and mini-golf.

Dom Sportova, a sport centre in northern Trešnjevka features six halls. The largest two have seating capacity of 5,000 and 3,100 people, respectively. This centre is used for basketball, handball, volleyball, hockey, gymnastics, tennis, etc. It also hosts music events.

Arena Zagreb was finished in 2008. The 16,500-seat arena hosted the 2009 World Men's Handball Championship. The Dražen Petrović Basketball Hall seats 5,400 people. Sports Park Mladost, situated on the embankment of the Sava river, has an Olympic-size swimming pool, smaller indoor and outdoor swimming pools, a sunbathing terrace, 16 tennis courts as well as basketball, volleyball, handball, football and field hockey courts. A volleyball sports hall is within the park. Sports and Recreational Center Šalata, located in Šalata, only a couple hundred meters from the Jelačić Square, is most attractive for tennis players. It comprises a big tennis court and eight smaller ones, two of which are covered by the so-called "balloon", and another two equipped with lights. The center also has swimming pools, basketball courts, football fields, a gym, and fitness center, and a four-lane bowling alley. Outdoor ice skating is a popular winter recreation. There are also several fine restaurants within and near the center.

Maksimir Tennis Center, located in Ravnice east of downtown, consists of two sports blocks. The first comprises a tennis center situated in a large tennis hall with four courts. There are 22 outdoor tennis courts with lights. The other block offers multipurpose sports facilities: apart from tennis courts, there are handball, basketball and indoor football grounds, as well as track and field facilities, a bocci ball alley and table tennis opportunities.

Recreational swimmers can enjoy a smaller-size indoor swimming pool in Daničićeva Street, and a newly opened indoor Olympic-size pool at Utrine sports center in Novi Zagreb. Skaters can skate in the skating rink on Trg Sportova (Sports Square) and on the lake Jarun Skaters' park. Hippodrome Zagreb offers recreational horseback riding opportunities, while horse races are held every weekend during the warmer part of the year.

The 38,923-seat Maksimir Stadium, last 10 years under renovation, is located in Maksimir in the northeastern part of the city. The stadium is part of the immense Svetice recreational and sports complex (ŠRC Svetice), south of the Maksimir Park. It is part of a significant green zone, which passes from Medvednica in the north toward the south. ŠRC Svetice, together with Maksimir Park, creates an ideal connection of areas which are assigned to sport, recreation, and leisure.

The latest larger recreational facility is Bundek, a group of two small lakes near the Sava in Novi Zagreb, surrounded by a partly forested park. The location had been used prior to the 1970s, but then went to neglect until 2006 when it was renovated.

In year 2021 Zagreb was the host city of Croatia Rally, round three of 2021 World Rally Championship. The Rally was won by Sébastien Ogier and Julien Ingrassia, Toyota Gazoo Racing WRT crew. Service parc, Overnight parc ferme and Shakedown Medvedgrad took place in Zagreb placing him as a lone capital in the championship. 2021 Croatia Rally became third tightest WRC event up to date, with only 0,6 seconds dividing the winning crew and second placed Elfyn Evans and Scott Martin (co-driver) in Toyota Yaris WRC. The Croatian round of WRC was praised by becoming the part of 2022 World Rally Championship.

Some of the most notable sport clubs in Zagreb are: GNK Dinamo Zagreb, KHL Medveščak Zagreb, RK Zagreb, KK Cibona, KK Zagreb, KK Cedevita, NK Zagreb, HAVK Mladost and others. The city hosted the 2016 Davis Cup World Group final between Croatia and Argentina.

Religion 

The Archdiocese of Zagreb is a metropolitan see of the Catholic Church in Croatia, serving as its religious center. The Archbishop is Josip Cardinal Bozanić. The Catholic Church is the largest religious organisation in Zagreb, Catholicism being the predominant religion of Croatia, with over 1.1 million adherents. Zagreb is also the Episcopal see of the Metropolitanate of Zagreb and Ljubljana of the Serbian Orthodox Church. Islamic religious organization of Croatia has the see in Zagreb. President is Mufti Aziz Hasanović. There used to be a mosque in the Meštrović Pavilion during World War II at the Square of the Victims of Fascism, but it was relocated to the neighborhood of Borovje in Peščenica. Mainstream Protestant churches have also been present in Zagreb – Evangelical (Lutheran) Church and Reformed Christian (Calvinist) Church. The Church of Jesus Christ of Latter-day Saints (LDS Church) is also present in the Zagreb neighborhood of Jarun whereas Jehovah's Witnesses have their headquarters in Central Zagreb. In total there are around 40 non-Catholic religious organizations and denominations in Zagreb with their headquarters and places of worship across the city making it a large and diverse multicultural community. There is also significant Jewish history through the Holocaust.

Economy 

Important branches of industry are: production of electrical machines and devices, chemical, pharmaceutical, textile, food and drink processing. Zagreb is an international trade and business centre, as well as an essential transport hub placed at the crossroads of Central Europe, the Mediterranean and the Southeast Europe. Almost all of the largest Croatian as well as Central European companies and conglomerates such as Agrokor, INA, Hrvatski Telekom have their headquarters in the city.

The only Croatian stock exchange is the Zagreb Stock Exchange, which is located in Eurotower, one of the tallest Croatian skyscrapers.

According to 2008 data, the city of Zagreb has the highest PPP and nominal gross domestic product per capita in Croatia at $32,185 and $27,271 respectively, compared to the Croatian averages of US$18,686 and $15,758.

As of May 2015, the average monthly net salary in Zagreb was 6,669 kuna, about €870 (Croatian average is 5,679 kuna, about €740). At the end of 2012, the average unemployment rate in Zagreb was around 9.5%.
34% of companies in Croatia have headquarters in Zagreb, and 38.4% of the Croatian workforce works in Zagreb, including almost all banks, utility and public transport companies.

Companies in Zagreb create 52% of the total turnover and 60% of the total profit of Croatia in 2006 as well as 35% of Croatian export and 57% of Croatian import.

The following table includes some of the main economic indicators for the period 2011–2019, based on the data by the Croatian Bureau of Statistics. A linear interpolation was used for the population data between 2011 and 2021. While data on the yearly averaged conversion rates between HRK, EUR and USD is provided by the Croatian National Bank, data regarding the PPP are based on OECD estimates.

Transport

Highways

Zagreb is the hub of five major Croatian highways.

The highway A6 was upgraded in October 2008 and leads from Zagreb to Rijeka, and forming a part of the Pan-European Corridor Vb. The upgrade coincided with the opening of the bridge over the Mura river on the A4 and the completion of the Hungarian M7, which marked the opening of the first freeway corridor between Rijeka and Budapest. The A1 starts at the Lučko interchange and concurs with the A6 up to the Bosiljevo 2 interchange, connecting Zagreb and Split ( Vrgorac). A further extension of the A1 up to Dubrovnik is under construction. Both highways are tolled by the Croatian highway authorities Hrvatske autoceste and Autocesta Rijeka - Zagreb.

Highway A3 (formerly named Bratstvo i jedinstvo) was the showpiece of Croatia in the SFRY. It is the oldest Croatian highway.
A3 forms a part of the Pan-European Corridor X. The highway starts at the Bregana border crossing, bypasses Zagreb forming the southern arch of the Zagreb bypass, and ends at Lipovac near the Bajakovo border crossing. It continues in Southeast Europe in the direction of Near East. This highway is tolled except for the stretch between Bobovica and Ivanja Reka interchanges.

Highway A2 is a part of the Corridor Xa. It connects Zagreb and the frequently congested Macelj border crossing, forming a near-continuous motorway-level link between Zagreb and Western Europe. Forming a part of the Corridor Vb, highway A4 starts in Zagreb forming the northeastern wing of the Zagreb bypass and leads to Hungary until the Goričan border crossing. It is often used highway around Zagreb.

The railway and the highway A3 along the Sava river that extend to Slavonia (towards Slavonski Brod, Vinkovci, Osijek and Vukovar) are some of the busiest traffic corridors in the country. The railway running along the Sutla river and the A2 highway (Zagreb-Macelj) running through Zagorje, as well as traffic connections with the Pannonian region and Hungary (the Zagorje railroad, the roads and railway to Varaždin – Čakovec and Koprivnica) are linked with truck routes. The southern railway connection to Split operates on a high-speed tilting trains line via the Lika region (renovated in 2004 to allow for a five-hour journey); a faster line along the Una river valley is in use only up to the border between Croatia and Bosnia and Herzegovina.

Roads

The city has an extensive avenue network with numerous main arteries up to ten lanes wide and Zagreb bypass, a congested four-lane highway encircling most of the city. Finding a parking space is supposed to be made somewhat easier by the construction of new underground multi-story parking lots (Importanne Center, Importanne Gallery, Lang Square, Tuškanac, Kvaternik Square, Klaić Street, etc.). The busiest roads are the main east–west arteries, former Highway "Brotherhood and Unity", consisting of Ljubljanska Avenue, Zagrebačka Avenue and Slavonska Avenue; and the Vukovarska Avenue, the closest bypass of the city center. The avenues were supposed to alleviate the traffic problem, but most of them are nowadays gridlocked during rush hour and others, like Branimirova Avenue and Dubrovnik Avenue which are gridlocked for the whole day. European routes E59, E65 and E70 serve Zagreb.

Bridges
In downstream order, these are:

There are also two rail traffic bridges across the Sava, one near the Sava bridge and one near Mičevec, as well as two bridges that are part of the Zagreb bypass, one near Zaprešić (west), and the other near Ivanja Reka (east).

Two additional bridges across the river Sava are proposed: Jarun Bridge and Bundek Bridge.

Public transportation

Public transportation in the city is organized in several layers: the inner parts of the city are mostly covered by trams, the outer city areas, and closer suburbs are linked with buses and rapid transit commuter rail.

The public transportation company ZET (Zagrebački električni tramvaj, Zagreb Electric Tram) operates trams, all inner bus lines, and most of the suburban bus lines, and it is subsidized by the city council.

The national rail operator Croatian Railways (Hrvatske željeznice, HŽ) runs a network of urban and suburban train lines in the metropolitan Zagreb area and is a government-owned corporation.

The funicular (uspinjača) in the historic part of the city is a tourist attraction.

Taxi market has been liberalized in early 2018 and numerous transport companies have been allowed to enter the market; consequently, the prices significantly dropped whereas the service was immensely improved so the popularity of taxis in Zagreb has been increasing from then onwards.

Tram network

Zagreb has an extensive tram network with 15 day and 4 night lines covering much of the inner- and middle-suburbs of the city. The first tram line was opened on 5 September 1891 and trams have been serving as a vital component of Zagreb mass transit ever since. The network operates at the curb whereas on larger avenues its tracks are situated inside the green belts.

An ambitious program, which entailed replacing old trams with the new and modern ones built mostly in Zagreb by companies Končar elektroindustrija and, to a lesser extent, by TŽV Gredelj, has recently been finished. The new "TMK 2200", trams by the end of 2012 made around 95% of the fleet.

Suburban rail network

The commuter rail network in Zagreb has existed since 1992. In 2005, suburban rail services were increased to a 15-minute frequency serving the middle and outer suburbs of Zagreb, primarily in the east–west direction and to the southern districts. This has enhanced the commuting opportunities across the city.

A new link to the nearby town of Samobor has been announced and is due to start construction in 2014. This link will be standard-gauge and tie in with normal Croatian Railways operations. The previous narrow-gauge line to Samobor called Samoborček was closed in the 1970s.

Air traffic

Zagreb Airport  is the main Croatian international airport, a  drive southeast of Zagreb in the city of Velika Gorica. The airport is also the main Croatian airbase featuring a fighter squadron, helicopters, as well as military and freight transport aircraft. The airport had 3,45 million passengers in 2019 with a new passenger terminal being opened in late March 2017 that can accommodate up to 5,5 million passengers.

Zagreb also has a second, smaller airport, Lučko . It is home to sports aeroplanes and a Croatian special police unit, as well as being a military helicopter airbase. Lučko used to be the main airport of Zagreb from 1947 to 1959.

A third, small grass airfield, Buševec, is located just outside Velika Gorica. It is primarily used for sports purposes.

Education

Zagreb has 136 primary schools and 100 secondary schools including 30 gymnasia. There are 5 public higher education institution and 9 private professional higher education schools.

In Zagreb you will also find 4 International Schools:

 American International School of Zagreb (AISZ) 
 The Learning Tree International Kindergarten (TLT) 
 French School in Zagreb 
 The German School in Zagreb.

University of Zagreb 

Founded in 1669, the University of Zagreb is the oldest continuously operating university in Croatia and one of the largest and oldest universities in the Southeastern Europe. Ever since its foundation, the university has been continually growing and developing and now consists of 29 faculties, three art academies and the Croatian Studies Centre. More than 200,000 students have attained the Bachelor's degree at the university, which has also assigned 18,000 Master's and 8,000 Doctor's degrees.
, the University of Zagreb is ranked among 500 Best Universities of the world by the Shanghai Academic Ranking of World Universities.

Zagreb is also the seat of two private universities: the Catholic University of Croatia and the Libertas International University; as well as numerous public and private polytechnics, colleges, and higher professional schools.

Notable people
 

Artists
Sanja Iveković (born 1949), photographer, performer, sculptor and installation artist
Jagoda Kaloper (1947–2016), painter and actress
Igor Kordej (born 1957), comic book artist
Darko Macan (born 1966), writer and illustrator
Velimir Neidhardt (born 1942), architect
Vera Nikolić Podrinska (1886–1972), painter and baroness
Srećko Puntarić (born 1952), cartoonist
Josip Račić (1885–1908), painter 
Esad Ribić (born 1972), comic book artist
Goran Sudžuka (born 1969), comic book artist
Marino Tartaglia (1894–1984), painter
Vladimir Varlaj (1895–1962), artist
Zdravko Zupan (1950–2015), comic book creator and historian

Footballers
Milan Badelj (born 1989), football player
Josip Brekalo (born 1998), football player
Marcelo Brozović (born 1992), football player
Tomislav Butina (born 1974), football player
Ivan Čunčić (born 1985), football player
Joško Gvardiol (born 2002), football player
Tin Jedvaj (born 1995), football player
Josip Juranović (born 1995), football player
Andrej Kramarić (born 1991), football player
Niko Kranjčar (born 1984), football player
Jerko Leko (born 1980), football player
Lovro Majer (born 1998), football player
Jasmin Mujdža (born 1974), football player 
Mensur Mujdža (born 1984), football player
Mislav Oršić (born 1992), football player
Dubravko Pavličić (1967–2012), football player
Josip Pivarić (born 1989), football player
Marko Pjaca (born 1995), football player
Dario Šimić (born 1975), football player
Zvonimir Soldo (born 1967), football player
Military
 Haim Bar-Lev (1924–1994), Israeli general and politician

Music
 Zlatko Baloković, violinist
 Miljenko Matijević, singer and songwriter; the lead vocalist of rock band Steelheart
 Zinka Milanov, operatic spinto soprano

Other sportspeople
Borna Ćorić (born 1996)
Krešimir Ćosić (1948–1995), basketball player
Danko Cvjetićanin (born 1963), basketball player
Josip Glasnović (born 1983), sports shooter, Olympic gold medal winner
Zlatko Horvat (born 1984), handball player
Filip Hrgović (born 1992), professional boxer
Ivo Karlović (born 1979), tennis player
Nenad Kljaić (born 1966), handball player
Vjekoslav Kobešćak (born 1974), water polo player and coach
Ivica Kostelić (born 1979), alpine ski racer
Janica Kostelić (born 1982), alpine ski racer, four-time Olympic gold medalist
Luka Lončar (born 1987), water polo player
Iva Majoli (born 1977), tennis player
Nikola Mektić (born 1988), tennis player, Olympic gold medal winner
Mirko Novosel (born 1938), basketball player
Tomislav Paškvalin (born 1961), water polo player
Sandra Perković (born 1990), discus thrower, won two gold medals at the Summer Olympics
Dubravko Šimenc (born 1966), water polo player
Martin Sinković (born 1989), rower, Olympic gold medal winner
Valent Sinković (born 1988), rower, Olympic gold medal winner
Tin Srbić (born 1996), artistic gymnast 
Manuel Štrlek (born 1988), handball player
Igor Vori (born 1980), handball player
Vedran Zrnić (born 1979), handball player

Religion
Mihalj Šilobod Bolšić (1724–1787) - Roman Catholic priest, mathematician, writer, and musical theorist primarily known for writing the first Croatian arithmetic textbook Arithmatika Horvatzka (published in Zagreb, 1758)

Science and humanities
Ivan Đikić (born 1966), molecular biologist, director of the Institute of Biochemistry II at Goethe University Frankfurt
Mario Jurić (born 1979), astronomer
Vesna Girardi-Jurkić (1944–2012), archeologist and museologist
Dragutin Gorjanović-Kramberger (1856–1936), geologist, paleontologist, and archeologist
Milan Kangrga (1923–2008), philosopher
Radoslav Katičić (1930–2019), linguist, classical philologist
Nada Klaić (1920–1988), historian
Ivo Kolin (1924–2007), inventor
Zdravko Lorković (1900–1998), biologist, entomologist and geneticist
Ranko Matasović (born 1968), linguist
Ivo Pilar (1874–1933), historian, politician, publicist and lawyer
Martin Previšić (born 1984), historian
Vesna Pusić (born 1953), sociologist and politician 
Marin Soljačić (born 1974), physicist and electrical engineer
Rudi Supek (1913–1993), sociologist and philosopher 
Goran Švob (1947–2013), philosopher and logician
Josip Torbar (1824–1900), natural scientist
Hrvoje Turković (born 1943), film theorist
Ljudevit Vukotinović (1813–1893), politician, writer and naturalist
Milena Žic-Fuchs (born 1954), linguist

Writers
Tituš Brezovački (1757–1805), playwright, satirist and poet
August Cesarec (1893–1941), writer
Bora Ćosić (born 1932), writer
Dimitrija Demeter (1811–1872), writer
Daša Drndić (1946–2018), writer
Zoran Ferić (born 1961), writer
Branko Gavella (1885–1962), theater director and essayist
Miroslav Krleža (1893–1981), writer, considered the greatest Croatian writer of the 20th century
Antun Mihanović (1796–1861), poet and lyricist, wrote the national anthem of Croatia
August Šenoa (1838–1881), novelist
Sunčana Škrinjarić (1931–2004), writer, poet and journalist
Davor Slamnig (born 1956), writer and musician
Slobodan Šnajder (born 1948), writer and publicist

Notes

References

Sources

External links

 Zagreb – Official website 
 Zagreb Tourist Board
 Zagreb Fair

 
Capitals in Europe
Cities and towns in Croatia
Counties of Croatia
Former counties of Croatia
Populated places in the City of Zagreb
Populated places on the Sava
Populated places established in the 11th century
11th-century establishments in Croatia
1094 establishments in Europe
Zagreb County (former)